The Eparchy of Edmonton is a Ukrainian Greek Catholic Church ecclesiastical territory or eparchy of the Catholic Church that governs parishes in the Canadian province of Alberta. It uses the Byzantine Rite liturgy in the Ukrainian language and English language. The eparchy's cathedral is St. Josaphat's Cathedral in the episcopal see of Edmonton, Alberta.

History 
On 19 January 1948, it was established as Ukrainian Catholic Apostolic Exarchate of Western Canada (an Eastern Catholic missionary pre-diocesan jurisdiction, akin to a Latin apostolic prefecture), on territory split off from the then Ukrainian Catholic Apostolic Exarchate of Canada.

On 10 March 1951, it was renamed as Ukrainian Catholic Apostolic Exarchate of Edmonton, after its see.
 
On 3 November 1956, promoted as Ukrainian Catholic Eparchy (Eastern Catholic diocese) of Edmonton. It thus lost its exempt status, becoming a suffragan in the ecclesiastical province of the Metropolitan Ukrainian Catholic Archeparchy of Winnipeg.
 
On 27 June 1974, it lost territory to establish the Ukrainian Catholic Eparchy of New Westminster.

On January 26, 2007 Pope Benedict XVI appointed former Auxiliary Bishop David Motiuk of the Archeparchy of Winnipeg as head of the Ukrainian Catholic Eparchy of Edmonton.

Extent 
As of 2020, the diocese contains 81 parishes, 35 active diocesan and religious priests and 25,000 Catholics. It also has 11 women religious, 4 religious brothers and 8 permanent deacons.

Bishops

Ordinaries 
 Apostolic Exarch of Western Canada 
 Neil Savaryn, Basilian Order of Saint Josaphat (O.S.B.M.) (1948.01.19 – 1951.03.10 see below), Titular Bishop of Ios (1943.04.03 – 1956.11.03); previously Auxiliary Exarch of Canada of the Ukrainians (Canada) (1943.04.03 – 1948.01.19)

 Apostolic Exarchs of Edmonton 
 Neil Savaryn, O.S.B.M. (see above 1951.03.10 – 1956.11.03 see below)

 Suffragan Eparchs (Diocesan bishops) of Edmonton
 Neil Savaryn, O.S.B.M. (see above'' 1956.11.03 – death 1986.01.08)
 Demetrius Greschuk (1986 – death 1990), previously Titular Bishop of Nazianzus (1974.06.27 – 1986.04.28) & Auxiliary Eparch of Edmonton of the Ukrainians (Canada) (1974.06.27 – 1986.04.28)
 Myron Daciuk, O.S.B.M. (1991 - death 1996), previously Titular Bishop of Thyatira (1982.06.24 – 1991.10.28) & Auxiliary Bishop of Winnipeg of the Ukrainians (Canada) (1982.06.24 – 1991.10.28)
 Lawrence Huculak, O.S.B.M. (1996.12.16 – 2006.01.09), later Metropolitan Archeparch of Winnipeg of the Ukrainians (Canada) (2006.01.09 – ...)
 David Motiuk (2007- ... ), Titular Bishop of Mathara in Numidia (2002.04.05 – 2007.01.25) & Auxiliary Bishop of Winnipeg of the Ukrainians (Canada) (2002.04.05 – 2007.01.25)

Auxiliary bishop
 Demetrius Martin Greschuk (1974-1986), appointed Bishop here

Other priest of this eparchy who became bishop
 Basil (Wasyl) Filevich (Felivich), appointed Bishop of Saskatoon (Ukrainian) in 1983

Eparchial Logo 
The golden church dome under a blue sky was a symbol of faith and hope for the Ukrainian Greek Catholics who emigrated to the New World. Today, it remains a recognizable image that is familiar and welcoming to all Albertans, no matter their background.

In this representation, logo designer Julian Hayda modelled his dome after St. Mary Ukrainian Catholic Parish in Waugh, Alberta. He explains, “What you see here are two paths, beginning at both East and West, and converging at a pinnacle as two hands holding one cross together.” He is referring to Eastern Catholics in full communion with Rome, joined in the one Catholic Church. The arms reaching upward also reflect our ardent desire to enter into communion with the awesomeness of God through the sacrificial love of Christ represented by the cross.

As in classical iconography, the colour blue also represents divinity. The darker the blue, the more deeply we enter into the life of the Holy Trinity. The circle stands for the eternal nature of God – without beginning or end. As such, God’s love for us is eternal – a mystery beyond our understanding. In contrast, the golden dome reflects the glory of God, the Divine Light visible to us. Its shape reminds us of the vault of heaven where we experience the embrace of the living God, especially through the Holy Mysteries, the Eucharist in particular.

Finally, an invitation, “Come follow me.” Christ who called the first disciples, also calls each and every one of us to follow him. A relatable and inspiring image, the logo of the Eparchy of Edmonton reflects the mission of the Church, to evangelize and share the Good News of the Gospel of Jesus Christ with everyone, no matter where they are on their faith journey.

Assigned Clergy 
Listed is the current Clergy assigned to each Church in the Eparchy

References 
 Eparchy of Edmonton page at catholichierarchy.org retrieved July 14, 2006

Sources and external links 
 
 GigaCatholic, with incumbent biography links

Edmonton
Ukrainian Catholic Church in Canada
Edmonton
Religious sees in Edmonton
Edmonton, Ukrainian Catholic Eparchy of